Thomas Denmark Burnette (July 29, 1915 – September 9, 1994) was a Blocking back American football player  who played one season for two teams, the Pittsburgh Pirates and the Philadelphia Eagles of the National Football League. He played college football at the University of North Carolina for the North Carolina Tar Heels football team. Burnette was drafted by the Pittsburgh Pirates in the 8th round of the 64th pick in the 1938 NFL Draft.

References

1915 births
1994 deaths
Players of American football from North Carolina
Pittsburgh Pirates (football) players
Philadelphia Eagles players
North Carolina Tar Heels football players